"Går min eigen veg", written by Torbjørn Sandvik and Geirmund Simonsen and performed by Glittertind, was released as a single in 2009 from the album Landkjenning. The song got playlisted in Norway's most popular radio channel  NRK P1 and is still regularly played on this radio channel.

Appearances in other media
A live acoustic version of this song was recorded as a promotional for the festival Volumfestivalen in 2011.

References

Songs written by Torbjørn Sandvik
Songs written by Geirmund Simonsen
2009 songs